Clemerson de Araújo Soares, best known as Araújo (born 8 August 1977) is a former Brazilian footballer who played as a forward.

Career
Araujo was born in Caruaru, PE, Brazil. He played for Japanese side Gamba Osaka in 2005; his 33 league goals helped Gamba to the 2005 J1 League title. 2005 was his last season in Japan. Araujo left for his homeland to sign for Cruzeiro. Two years later Araujo left for Qatar where he the 2007–08 season top scorer award.

Al-Gharafa
Al-Gharafa, known as Al Fuhud (The Cheetahs) were Qatar's champions for three years in a row. Araujo was a leading star in the team's success, leading the scorers list for the entire 2008 season. On 4 March 2008, after scoring against Al Khor, he matched Gabriel Batistuta's record of 25 goals in one season.  He eventually ended the season as the league's top scorer with 27 goals, a record that was broken in December 2018 by Baghdad Bounedjah. He played alongside fellow Brazilian Juninho Pernambucano. He left in 2010 due to personal reasons, but in 2012 he stated he was interested in rejoining the club.

Club statistics

Honours

Club
Goiás State League: 1998, 1999, 2000, 2002, 2003
Brazilian League (2nd division): 1999
Brazilian Center-West Cup: 2000, 2001, 2002
J1 League: 2005
Minas Gerais State League: 2006
Qatar Stars League: 2007–08, 2008–09,2009–10
Qatari Stars Cup: 2009–10
Emir of Qatar Cup: 2009
Qatar Crown Prince Cup: 2009–10

Individual
World's top scorer in 2005: 33 goals in 33 games, considered world's best striker in 2005 by the International Federation of Football History & Statistics (IFFHS).
J. League MVP: 2005
J. League Top Scorer: 2005
J. League Best Eleven: 2005
Japanese Footballer of the Year: 2005
Qatari League Top Scorer: 2007–08
Super Awards Best Player in Qatar Stars League: 2009

References

External links 
 mercado
 sambafoot
 
 

 Araújo at ZeroZero

1977 births
Living people
Brazilian footballers
Goiás Esporte Clube players
Shimizu S-Pulse players
Gamba Osaka players
Cruzeiro Esporte Clube players
Al-Gharafa SC players
Fluminense FC players
Clube Náutico Capibaribe players
Clube Atlético Mineiro players
Japanese Footballer of the Year winners
J1 League Player of the Year winners
Expatriate footballers in Japan
Expatriate footballers in Qatar
Brazilian expatriate footballers
Brazil under-20 international footballers
Campeonato Brasileiro Série A players
Campeonato Brasileiro Série B players
Qatar Stars League players
People from Caruaru
Association football forwards
Sportspeople from Pernambuco